Mohammed Saeme (born 9 December 1956) is founder of the International Maritime Health Association. He has founded various maritime health and wellness companies and is a medical adviser for major cruise lines.

Early life and career
Saeme was born in Fez, Morocco. He studied in Morocco and was licensed as a medical doctor in 1981 and received his doctorate in 1983. He then resided in Oslo, Norway from 1983 to 1999, and became a Norwegian citizen in 1991. Saeme currently resides in Monte Carlo, Monaco, since 1999.

From 1983 to 1999, he practiced medicine in Norway, serving as a seaman's doctor. He was also a private general practitioner in Oslo as well as a part-time emergency physician. In 1986, he started his involvement in the maritime industry when he became the ship doctor for the cruise ship Sea Goddess.

International Maritime Health
Saeme has worked around the world, controlling health, hygiene and sanitation on-board commercial and passenger ships and oil platforms.  He has also participated in the preparation of new regulations on ship hygiene, sanitation, pharmacy, and minimum standards for cruise ship medical facilities, as well as the updating of the standards for pre-employment medical examinations for seafarers. In 1997, Saeme founded the International Maritime Health Organization, and became its first president from 1997 to 2001. He has also served as consultant and adviser to various cruise lines.

Businesses
In 1996, he established the Maritime Clinic for International Seafarers, Inc. in the Philippines, catering to pre-employment medical exam of seafarers. He also founded Universal Maritime Services, Inc. in 1998 at Nassau, Bahamas as a management company that provides consultation on medical facilities and staffing for cruise lines and shipping companies.

References

External links 
 Maritime Clinic for International Seafarers, Inc.
 Universal Maritime Services, Inc.
 SAEMED, LTD.
 Wellness & Cruise
 Cruise Lines International Association
 4th International Symposium on Maritime Health
 Expatriate Healthcare, Travel Insurance & Global Healthcare Conference - Speakers
 Cruise Ship & Maritime Medicine Section - Cruise Line Directory
 Smooth Sailing ~ Cruise Lines and Medical Tourism, a Budding Relationship 

1956 births
Moroccan general practitioners
Norwegian general practitioners
Living people
People from Fez, Morocco
Occupational health practitioners